Michael Keohane is a paralympic athlete from the United States competing mainly in category T46 distance running events.

Michael ran the 1500m and 5000m at the 1996 Summer Paralympics, but it was at the 2000 Summer Paralympics in Sydney where he won his first and only medal, a bronze in the T46 marathon race.

References

Paralympic track and field athletes of the United States
Athletes (track and field) at the 1996 Summer Paralympics
Athletes (track and field) at the 2000 Summer Paralympics
Paralympic bronze medalists for the United States
Living people
Medalists at the 2000 Summer Paralympics
Year of birth missing (living people)
Place of birth missing (living people)
Paralympic medalists in athletics (track and field)
American male long-distance runners
American male marathon runners
Marathon runners with limb difference
Paralympic marathon runners
20th-century American people